Geoffrey Bennison ranks among England's most influential designers. Though he died in 1984, his legacy lives on through the fabrics his company continues to produce, and the enduring beauty of the houses he decorated.

Bennison is a surname. Notable people with the surname include:

Amira Bennison, historian of the Middle East, senior lecturer in Middle Eastern and Islamic Studies in the University of Cambridge
Andrew Bennison (1866–1942), American screenwriter and film director
Charles Bennison, 15th bishop of the Episcopal Diocese of Pennsylvania
Ishia Bennison, British actress on television and stage
John Bennison (1926–2017), Australian company executive
Louis Bennison (1883–1929), American stage and silent film actor

See also
Bennison Island, uninhabited granite island near the northern coast of Wilsons Promontory National Park
Bennison railway station (originally Franklin River) was a railway station on the South Gippsland line in South Gippsland, Victoria